Lucinda L. Combs-Stritmatter (October 10, 1849April 23, 1919) was an American physician who was the first female medical missionary to provide medical care in China and is credited with establishing the first women's hospital in what was then Peking (now Beijing). Combs was a pioneer in women's medical care while serving the Women's Foreign Ministry Society's North China Mission for seven years.

Early life 

Combs, known by her friends and family as "Lucy", was born on October 10, 1849, in Cazenovia, New York. She is not known to have had any siblings. Combs parents died leaving her orphaned at a young age. It is unknown through which means specifically, but she supported and educated herself following the tragedy. After converting to Christianity, she became a teacher. Combs learned about the Methodist Episcopal Church's work commissioned in India and felt called to that line of work herself. She ultimately decided to further educate herself in order to be prepared for an appointment as a missionary in India.

Education 
Determined to pursue her education, Combs enrolled in the Cazenovia Seminary in Cazenovia, New York in 1866. The Cazenovia Seminary, though not theological in its purpose, was a three-year program associated with the Methodist Episcopal Church. After completing the program in 1869, Combs graduated top of her class with honors.
 
To finance her desire to attend medical school, Combs looked for domestic employment. She soon found a wealthy family that was willing to employ her. Combs managed to perform her domestic responsibilities while attending medical school.
Combs enrolled at the Women's Medical College in Philadelphia, Pennsylvania in 1870. She drew the attention of the Methodist women in Philadelphia who helped her continue her studies. Combs received her degree from the Women's Medical College on March 12, 1873 in Philadelphia.

Career

Missionary work
Almost immediately upon receiving her medical degree, Combs was commissioned by the Women's Foreign Ministry Society (WFMS). Although she intended to serve in India, she boarded a ship for Peking, China on June 5, 1873. Among the other passengers on the ship was Andrew Stritmatter who had been commissioned to work in Jiujiang. Stritmatter and Combs grew close during their voyage and the couple would ultimately marry in the coming years. Combs departed from San Francisco, but her journey was delayed due to an unfortunate illness. Her illness held her in Japan for several weeks before being well enough to continue travel. She arrived in Peking in late August or early September, almost three months after her original departure and quickly began her work. She is noted for being the first female medical missionary to provide medical care in China.

Establishing the first women's hospital 

Although medical attention had arrived in Peking about ten years prior, through the London Missionary Society's appointment of William Lockhart, for the most part, medical services were not extended to women. Sex segregation consequently restricted women from seeking medical care from men. After writing a letter expressing her desire to open a hospital to serve native Chinese women, the Philadelphia branch of the WFMS congregated at the General Executive Committee meeting in May 1874. During their meeting, they agreed to set aside a $2000 fund toward the establishment of a hospital for women and children in Peking. The land on which the hospital and residence building would be built was procured in December 1874.

The first patient treated in the Peking Woman's Hospital was a Chinese woman who had fallen and sustained a foot injury. After treating her, Combs recalled that the family was very grateful to her. In the five months following its completion in November 1875, the hospital received 18 patients. Founding the first women's hospital in China gave Combs a platform to advocate for medical training and education for women and for the improvement of sanitary and hygiene practiced in relevant medical facilities. Although hesitant at first, the Chinese population in Peking soon came to appreciate the medical help provided by a female physician.

Community care 
During the building of the hospital, Combs served the Chinese women in their homes while learning and mastering the language. She made 198 home visits throughout her first year and treated 37 patients, some over several weeks. In her first year, she prescribed for 314 cases. In addition to providing medical care, Combs made an effort to convert the women whom she served to Christianity. Her marriage to Andrew Strittmater led to her relocation to Jiujiang. There, Combs took on the work of a physician and missionary, Miss Mason, who was leading the medical work in Jiujiang but had returned to the United States after becoming very ill. Combs treated countless patients in Jiujiang as well in addition to many cases in the outskirts of the city. Combs's medical experience and skill helped ease the transition of leadership following Miss Mason's quick illness.

Later life and death 

Combs met Andrew Stritmatter aboard a ship of missionaries that departed for China in 1873. As her five-year contract with the WFMS came to a close, Combs and Stritmatter were married in Shanghai on November 19, 1877, by Bishop I. W. Wiley. Soon after their marriage, the couple moved to the southern part of China to a place known as Jiujiang. Although her marriage resulted in the end of her commission to the WFMS, Combs continued to practice medicine in her new location. The couple had two sons named Edward and Albert,  both born in China. About two years after their relocation, Stritmatter contracted tuberculosis which led the couple to begin the journey back to the United States in October 1880. The long journey resulted in Stritmatter's untimely death one month later in Denver, Colorado. He died before arriving at his family home in Ohio. Combs remained in Colorado following her husband's death to raise her two children and continue practicing medicine. She never remarried.

After practicing medicine in Denver for six years, Combs moved to Columbus, Ohio to be close to her late husband's family and to spend the remainder of her days. She died in her son's home on April 23, 1919, in Franklin County, Ohio at the age of 68 years old. She was buried at Union Cemetery in Columbus, Ohio.

Legacy
Three months prior to her marriage, Combs was joined at her mission station by Leonora King. The pair of physicians worked alongside each other for three months before Combs relocated to Jiujiang with her husband. King consequently took over her responsibilities as the primary physician at the Woman's hospital. In 1879, Leonora King successfully treated the wife of Li Hongzhang, Viceroy of the province of Chih-li. The connection between King and the powerful family of the Viceroy resulted in the funding and construction of a surgery unit and medical dispensary.

Publications 
Combs published many works during her studies and throughout her medical career. During her time at Women's Medical College of Pennsylvania, she published a 22-page handwritten thesis on the study of medical hysteria. Additionally, she wrote several pieces for the Women's Missionary Methodist Episcopal Church monthly newspaper called The Heathen Woman's Friend. In this, Combs published three distinct works describing her life as a missionary titled: "A Bright Day at the Peking Hospital", "The Peking Hospital", and "A Morning's Visit at the Peking Hospital".

References

1849 births
1919 deaths
People from Cazenovia, New York
Cazenovia College alumni
Methodists from New York (state)
19th-century American women physicians
19th-century American physicians
20th-century American women physicians
20th-century American physicians
American physicians
Physicians from New York (state)
Woman's Medical College of Pennsylvania alumni
American Methodist missionaries
Female Christian missionaries
Christian medical missionaries
Methodist missionaries in China
American expatriates in China
Woman's Foreign Missionary Society of the Methodist Episcopal Church